David A. Zuberer is an American microbiologist, currently Professor Emeritus at Texas A&M University.

References

Year of birth missing (living people)
Living people
Texas A&M University faculty
American microbiologists